Melanophylla angustior is a species of plant in the Torricelliaceae family. It is endemic to Madagascar.  Its natural habitat is subtropical or tropical moist lowland forests. It is threatened by habitat loss.

References

External links
 Description of species

Endemic flora of Madagascar
angustior
Taxonomy articles created by Polbot

Endangered flora of Africa